Field hockey was contested for men only at the 1966 Asian Games in Bangkok, Thailand.

India won its first gold medal by defeating the two-time defending champions Pakistan 1–0 after extra time in the final. Japan won its first medal by defeating Malaysia 1–0 in the bronze medal match.

Medalists

Draw
The draw for hockey competition was held on 5 December 1966.

Group A

Group B

Results

Preliminary round

Group A

Group B

Consolation round

5–8th place semi-finals

5th place match

Medal round

Semi-finals

Bronze medal match

Gold medal match

Final standings

References

External links
 Asian Games field hockey results

 
1966 Asian Games events
1966
Asian Games
1966 Asian Games